A reward website is a website that offers rewards for performing tasks, usually related to selected retailers and organizations. These tasks may include, buying goods or services through referral links, submitting content, participating in a survey or referral of members.

Reward types

Cashback rewards

These are usually the simplest reward websites from the user's perspective, since the reward website will usually display a task and the amount of cashback that will be rewarded for completing the task. Cashback websites are often rewarded for online shopping and there is usually a threshold on when a customer can withdraw their earnings, driving loyalty to the cashback website.

Points rewards
These are usually less simple, since the reward website will usually only display the reward for performing a task in terms of points. These points can then be converted, for example into online gift vouchers. Alternatively, for each point collected, or after reaching a point's threshold, customers sometimes receive an entry into a sweepstake. This means that the website only ever gives away a pre-determined prize, regardless of how many points are given away.

Share rewards
Share rewards websites allow customers, on becoming a member of the site, to become a shareholder on the website or a company related to the website. Customers, on completing tasks such as online shopping, can then increase their stake on the website.

See also
Incentive Program
Incentive
Travel incentive
Loyalty Program
Loyalty Marketing

References
Customers Reward Website